A broken leg is a fracture of the leg bone.

Broken leg may also refer to:

"Broken Leg", a song by Bluejuice
Broke Leg Creek, a stream in Kentucky

See also
Break a leg (disambiguation)